Craspedocephalus andalasensis, commonly known as the Sumatran palm pit viper, is a venomous pitviper species native to the Indonesian island of Sumatra.

Geographic range
C. andalasensis is known from North Sumatra and West Sumatra. Though known from a few specimens only, it is likely to be widespread in Sumatra.

Habitat and conservation
Although it is negatively impacted by deforestation, it is believed to be widespread enough to not be threatened overall. C. andalasensis  occurs in the Mount Leuser National Park.

References

andalasensis
Snakes of Asia
Reptiles of Indonesia
Endemic fauna of Sumatra
Reptiles described in 2006